Kozlov is a municipality and village in Havlíčkův Brod District in the Vysočina Region of the Czech Republic. It has about 200 inhabitants.

Administrative parts
Villages of Leština, Olešná, Sychrov and Vrbka are administrative parts of Kozlov.

References

Villages in Havlíčkův Brod District